was a Japanese aircraft/automotive engineer.
He is famous for the development of the Subaru 360, the Subaru Sambar and the Subaru 1000 series.

History 
 February 20, 1919 – Born in Shiojiri, Nagano Prefecture as the second son of a Sake brewer.
 April 1939 – Entered the Department of Aeronautics, Tokyo Imperial University (Majored in engine) 
 January 1942 – Joined Nakajima Aircraft Company. He was enlisted as an Ensign by the Imperial Japanese Navy twenty days after he joined Nakajima. He was attached to the Yokosuka Naval Air Technical Arsenal ("Kugisho") and assigned to explore jet engine and gas turbine. 
 1944 – As a Naval officer, he was sent back to his home company Nakajima to examine the installation of turbocharger to the Nakajima Homare engine of the Nakajima C6N 
 August 15, 1945 – Around ten design staff including Momose remained at Koizumi Plant of Nakajima Aircraft Company. 
 1949 – Designed and launched the monocoque rear-engine bus Fuji TR014X-2.

 January 1951 –  Assigned to design the Subaru 1500 (project number "P-1").
 February 1954 – Initial model of the Subaru 1500 was completed. 

 December 1955 – Production of Subaru 1500 was cancelled and Momose was assigned to design the Subaru 360 at the same time. 
 November 1957 – Assigned as the senior engineering manager, Isesaki Plant, Fuji Heavy Industries 
 March 3, 1958 – Subaru 360 was launched. 

 October 1960 – Assigned as the senior engineering manager, Gunma Workshop (Ota City), Fuji Heavy Industries
 February 1961 – The first generation Subaru Sambar was launched. 

 October 21, 1965 – Subaru 1000 was shown to the press at the Tokyo Hilton Hotel (where The Beatles stayed in June and July 1966) 
 May 14, 1966 – Subaru 1000 was launched.

 October 1966 – Promoted to the engineering director, Fuji Heavy Industries
 May 1967 – Promoted to a board member of Fuji Heavy Industries
 August 1968 – Assigned as the executive officer of the Subaru Engineering Division
 June 1975 – Assigned as the executive officer of the Subaru Service Division
 June 1983 – Assigned as a statutory auditor, Fuji Heavy Industries
 1987 - Awarded to the Technology Contribution Prize by the Society of Automotive Engineers of Japan (JSAE) 
 June 1991 – Assigned as the technical advisor of the Subaru Research Laboratory
 January 21, 1997 – Deceased
 2004 – Inducted to the Japan Automotive Hall of Fame

See also
 Nakajima Aircraft Company
 Nakajima C6N
 Yokosuka Naval Air Technical Arsenal
 Fuji Heavy Industries
 Subaru 1500
 Subaru 360
 Subaru Sambar
 Subaru 1000

References
 Shinroku Momose History and Biography Japan Automotive Hall of Fame Official Website (Japanese)
 In the Mind of Subaru 1000 Development Engineers Source: “Subaru” magazine – Subaru 1000 extra edition (issued May 20, 1966) (Japanese)

1919 births
1997 deaths
Japanese aerospace engineers
Japanese automotive engineers
Subaru
Imperial Japanese Navy personnel of World War II
Imperial Japanese Navy officers
People from Nagano Prefecture
University of Tokyo alumni
Japanese business executives
Corporate executives in the automobile industry